David Hurwitz may refer to:

 David Hurwitz (actor), actor and voice actor
 David Hurwitz (music critic) (born 1961), classical music critic and author
 David Hurwitz (physician) (1905–1992), physician, educator and researcher

See also
 David Horowitz
 David Horowitz (disambiguation)